Peace River North is a provincial electoral district for the Legislative Assembly of British Columbia, Canada. It was created under the name North Peace River by the Constitution Amendment Act, 1955, which split the old riding of Peace River into northern and southern portions for the 1956 BC election. Its current name has been in use since 1991.

Peace River North has been represented by a variety of British Columbia Political parties over the years. The riding has consistently elected political parties that come from the right side of the political spectrum. For many years the riding was represented by the BC Social Credit Party. Currently, the riding is represented by the centre-right BC Liberal Party. The left of centre New Democratic party has never been successful in electing a candidate to the BC Legislature, despite fielding numerous candidates since the 1950s.

Geography
As of the 2020 provincial election, Peace River North comprises the entire area of the Northern Rockies Regional Municipality and the northern portion of the Peace River Regional District, located in northeastern British Columbia. The electoral district is bordered by Alberta in the east and the Yukon and Northwest Territories to the north. Communities in the electoral district consist of Fort St. John, Fort Nelson, Taylor and Hudson's Hope.

Member of Legislative Assembly 
This riding has elected the following Members of the Legislative Assembly:

History

Election results

Citations

References 
Results of 2013 election (pdf)
BC Stats Profile - 2001 (pdf)
Results of 2001 election (pdf)
2001 Expenditures (pdf)
Results of 1996 election
1996 Expenditures (pdf)
Results of 1991 election
1991 Expenditures
Website of the Legislative Assembly of British Columbia

British Columbia provincial electoral districts
Fort St. John, British Columbia
Peace River Country